The grammar, the conjugation and the morphology of Tunisian Arabic is very similar to that of other Maghrebi Arabic varieties. It is based on Classical Arabic and influenced by Berber languages and Latin, with some morphological inventions. The Berber influence is more noticeable in Pre-Hilalian dialects.

Pronouns

Personal pronouns
Tunisian Arabic has 7 personal pronouns since gender differentiation of the 2nd person in the singular form is absent.

Example : آنا زادة « Āna zāda. » — "Me too."

Possessive pronouns
The possessive pronouns are used as possessive articles when put as a suffix to a preposition or a noun. When it is used after a verb, their functions are rather direct object pronouns. The ones between parenthesis are the ones used after a structure finishing by a vowel.

Note, that with feminine words which are generally finished with an ة a, a ت t is added before the suffixes which become tī, tik, tū, thā, tnā, tkum and thum

Indirect object pronouns
Indirect Object Pronouns are used as a suffix after the verb and before the ش- -š of the negation. When there is a combination of direct and indirect object pronouns, indirect object pronouns are always written in the end. Furthermore, the first short i for the indirect Object pronoun is always dropped when it is written after a vowel.

Indefinite pronouns
Indefinite pronouns are used as a subject to explain general ideas or to report the facts which were done by an unknown person:
 واحد wāḥid (m.), واحدة waḥda (f.), وحود wḥūd (pl.) “Someone”
 الواحد il-wāḥid “The individual”
 فلان flān, Fem. فلانة flāna “such”
 أيّ eyy “Any”
 إلّي يجي illī yjī, Fem. إلّي تجي illī tjī “Anyone”
 كل واحد kull wāḥid “Everyone”
 حاجة ḥāja “Something”
 حتّى واحد ḥattā wāḥid “No one”
 آخر āxir (m.), أخرة uxra (f.), أخرين uxrīn (pl.) “Other”
 الكل il-kull “Everybody”

Interrogative pronouns 
The next interrogative pronouns are used when asking a question in Tunisian Arabic.

Articles

Definite articles
Translated in English as "The" Article, "il-" (ال) is used as an added prefix to denote nouns as definite. If the defined nouns begins with a Sun Consonant (n, ṇ, t, ṭ, d, dz, s, ṣ, š, z, ẓ, j, ŧ, đ, ḑ, l, r	and ṛ), "il-" would be pronounced as i + the Sun Consonant with which the noun begins. For example:

 الجريدة il-jarīda [ɪʒ:æri:dæ] meaning the Newspaper
 الكرسي il-kursī [ɪlkʊrsi] meaning the chair

Demonstrative articles
Like in Standard Arabic, Demonstrative Articles can be used as demonstrative pronouns when they are put alone as subjects. When they are articles, they can be written before or after the considered noun which should be definite by "il-".

For example: "This book" could be written in Tunisian as هٰاذا الكتاب hāđā il-ktāb or even as الكتاب هٰاذا il-ktāb hāđā.

When the demonstrative article is before the noun, it can be substituted by an abbreviated form which is ها hā for this and these, هاذْ hāđ for this and هٰاكْ hāk for that and those.

For example, "This book" could be written in Tunisian as ها الكتاب hā il-ktāb.

Possessive articles

Although they do exist, possessive articles in Tunisian Arabic are not used the same way as in English. They mainly show possession valorization in a sentence. Furthermore, they are only used after a definite noun.

For example: الكورة متاعك "il-kūra mtāɛik"- "Your ball"

Indeed, as in Arabic and other languages, possessive pronouns replaces them when there is not a valorization and a stress of the fact of possessing the item. These suffixes are the same as the ones used for conjugation of some verbs, and represent the ending sound of the possessive articles.

For example: كورتك "kūrtik"- "Your ball"

Modal verbs
Differently from English which uses base form for the second verb (invariable for all pronouns), Tunisian Arabic uses present (or rather imperfect) form for it. However, the second verb could be in the past (or rather perfect) form for the three modal verbs راه rāh, حقّه Haqqū and ماذابيه māđābīh (لوكان lūkān should be written before the second verb) which do not have a past form. Moreover, قاعد qāɛid could be used before an active participle. Furthermore, all the modal verbs could be in negative form as in Standard English excepting راهه rāhū and ماذابيه māđābīh. For example, ماذابينا نمشيوا māđābīnā nimšīū becomes in negative form ماذابينا ما نمشيوش māđābīnā mā nimšīūš and راهه تكلّم Rāhū tkallim becomes in negative form راهه ما تكلّمش Rāhū mā  tkallimš.

Hāhū (To be, drawing attention to the presence of the referent)

Example: هاني هوني « Hānī hūnī. » "I'm here."

Ṛāhū (To be, with more intensity by emphasizing it)

Example : راني هوني « Ṛānī hūnī. » — "attention, I'm here."

Māhū (To be, as an evidence marker or in a questioning manner as in tag questions)

Example : ماني هوني « Mānī hūnī. » — "Am I not, here ?." or « Māchīn, māhū ?. » — "We are going, isn't it?."

Qāɛid (To be, at the immediate moment)

Example : قاعدين ناكلوا « Qāɛdīn nāklū. » — "we are eating."

Najjam (Could)

Example : نجموا ياكلوا « najjmū yāklū. » — "They could eat."

Ynajjam (Can, To be able to)

Example : ينجّموا ياكلوا « Ynajjmū yāklū. » — "They can eat."

Ḥaqū (Should)

Example : حقه يتكلّم « Ḥaqū yitkallim. » — "He should speak."

Kaṛū (Would better, stronger intensity than should)

Example : كارني تتكلّم « kaṛnī tkāllimt. » — "I would better have spoken."

Yilzmū (Have to)

Example : يلزمنا نمشيوا « Yilzimnā nimšīū. » — "We have to go."

Lāzmū (Must)

Example : لازمنا نمشيوا « Lāzimnā nimšīū. » — "We must go."

Māđābīh (Had better) 

Example : ماذابينا نمشيوا « Māđābīnā nimšīū. » — "We had better go."

Discourse markers
Tunisian Arabic involve Discourse markers that are used to emphasize some facts in discussions. These facts could be even evidences and conclusions.

Evidence markers
Evidence markers are mainly modal verbs. ṛāhū راهه is used to mark a fact as evident in the affirmative form. It is substituted by  ṃāhū ماهه when asking about a supposed evident fact.

Conclusion markers
Conclusion markers are mainly conjunctions. yāxī ياخي is used to mark a fact as a conclusion in the affirmative form. It is substituted by mālā مالا when asking to approve supposed conclusion.

Preverbal markers
Preverbal markers or auxiliaries are verbs that are used to denote the status of a given action. They are conjugated as Subject + Preverbal marker (Any tense and form) + Action Verb (In present unless the preverbal marker is in imperative. The verb is in imperative in this situation). For example, qūm ixdim قوم اخدم meaning go to work.

Verb conjugation

Perfective and imperfective tenses

Regular verbs
There are significant differences in morphology between Tunisian and Standard Arabic. Standard Arabic marks 13 person/number/gender distinctions in the verbal paradigm, whereas the dialect of Tunis marks only 7 (the gender distinction is found only in the third person singular). Nomadic Tunisian Arabic dialects also mark gender for the second person in singular, in common with most spoken varieties of Arabic elsewhere in the Arabic world.

In general, the regular verbs are conjugated according to the following pattern:

The second-person singular of the three Nomadic Tunisian Arabic dialects has distinct masculine and feminine forms, with the masculine forms being as above كتبت ktibt and تكتب tiktib, and the feminine forms being كتبتِ ktibtī (perfective) and تكتبي tiktbī (imperfective).

Weak verbs
Verbs with a final semivowel ā, known as "weak" verbs, have a different pattern. This pattern is determined according to the third letter in the root of the verb. Moreover, the verbs having a glottal stop as a first letter of their root are also considered as weak verbs.

Nomadic dialects have a different third-person singular feminine perfective form as in مشيت , حبيت , بديت  and خذيت  and delete the stem vowel in the plural imperfective forms, giving forms such as نمشوا  , نحبوا , نبدوا  and نوخذوا . For example, تمشيوا timcīū is pronounced as [timʃe:u] in Sahil and southeastern dialects.

Irregular verbs

Future tense
The future tense in Tunisian Arabic is also similar to Berber, more precisely Zenata Berber that was spoken by the majority of Tunisians ancestors:
 باش bāš + verb  → "will" + verb (ex: باش تتكسّر  → it will break)
 ماش māš or باش bāš + verb  → "will" + verb (ex: ماش نكسّرها  → I will break it)

Taw or Tawwa can be used as a time indicator with a verb in present to mean "being going to do something".

Imperative tense
The imperative form is considered the stem for the present tense.

Conditional tenses

Conditional present
The conditional present is conjugated as Kaṛū or Ḥaqqū + Verb in Present tense. This tense is generally used to show regret.

Conditional past

I should have done something
For the past conditional, the same structures seen above are used, but instead of the present tense, the past tense is used.

I could have done something
This structure is conjugated as kān ynajjam + Verb in the present tense.

I would have done something
This structure is conjugated as ṛāhū + Verb in the present tense.

Verb derivation
Verb derivation is done by adding prefixes or by doubling consonants to the simple verb having the root fɛal (Triconsonantal) or faɛlil (Quadriconsonantal). The verb's root determines the possible derivations. Generally, the patterns used in Verb Derivation are the same as in Standard Arabic.

Triconsonantal verbs
 Causative: is obtained by doubling consonants :
خرج  "to go out" → خرّج  "to take out"
دخل  "to enter" → دخّل  "to bring in, to introduce"
 Adding ā between the first two radical consonants, e.g. xālaṭ “to frequent”
 Inchoative: Adding ā between the last two radical consonants, e.g. ḥmār “turn red”
قتل  "to kill" → تقتل  "to be killed"
شرب  "to drink" → تّشرب  "to be drunk".
 Prefixing ist– to the verb, e.g. istaxbar “to get informed”
 Prefixing i- to the verb and Infixing t after the first radical consonant, e.g. اجتمع ijtmaɛ “to assemble”

Quadriconsonantal verbs
 Prefixing it– to the verb, e.g. اتفركس itfarkis “to be searched”

Verb forms

Exclamative form
The exclamative form can be formed by the intonation and in this particular situation, the sentence ends with an exclamation mark to distinguish it from an affirmative sentence Furthermore, it can be formed using Qaddāš + Noun or Possessive Pronoun + Adjective or Imperfective verb + !.

Interrogative form
The interrogative form can be formed by two methods: The intonation and the Suffix -š. When an interrogative adverb or pronoun exists, the question is an āš question that is equivalent to the English wh question and if the question does not involve any interrogative adverb or pronoun, it is an īh/lā question that is equivalent to the English Yes/No Question.
 The Intonation: Which is a variation of the spoken pitch to distinguish a question from an affirmative sentence. In writing, a question mark is used after an affirmative sentence to transform it into an interrogative sentence.
Example: تحبّ تمشي لتونس tḥibb timšī l- tūnis?, Do you want to go to Tunisia?
 The Suffix -š: -š or -šī can be suffixed to the verb to indicate an interrogative sentence.
Example: تعرفوشي؟ taɛṛfūšī?, Do you know him?

Negative form

 With verbs conjugated in the present, past and conditional tenses: 
To make the negative form, we put me in front of the verb and š at the end of the verb.
Example: ما فهمش الدرس mā fhimš il-dars, He didn't understand the lesson. 
N.B.: With the past conditional (would have) this negative form is used with the main verb. Example: لوكان عرفت راني ما جيتش lūkān ɛṛaft rānī mā jītš, If I knew I would not have come.
 With The Future And Present Participle: 
To negate the present participles and the verbs conjugated in the future, mūš, or its conjugated form, is added in front of the verb. 
Example: موش باش نشوفه الجمعة هاذي mūš bāš nšūfū ij-jumɛa hāđī, I won't see him this week.
موش mūš is conjugated as follows:

Relative clause
The only relative pronoun used in Tunisian Arabic is illī meaning who or that and its short form is lī.

Nouns

Gender

Masculine gender
Nouns ending either in a consonant, u, i, ū or ī are usually masculine.
For example: باب bāb “door”, كرسي kursī “chair”.
There are, however, some exceptions. Indeed, some consonant-final and some ī-final nouns are in the feminine gender (usually, names of countries and cities, and names of parts of the body, and nouns ending in –t are in the feminine).
For example: پاريز Pārīz “Paris”, بيت bīt “room”, بسكلات bisklāt “bicycle”.

Uninflected feminine gender
Nouns ending with a or ā vowel are usually in the feminine.

For example: سنّة sinna “tooth”, خريطة xarīṭa “map”.

There are, however, a few exceptions: أعمى aɛmā “blind man”, ممشى mamšā “alley”, عشاء ɛšā “dinner”.

Inflected feminine gender
 Feminization: Generally, male nouns form their feminine by the suffixation of a vowel. For example, كلب kalb > كلبة kalba, جدّ jadd > جدّة jadda, بطل bṭal > بطلة baṭla. Some male nouns, however, do not form their feminine by the suffixation of a, but have suppletive female counterparts. For example, راجل rājel > مرا mra, ولد wlad > طفلة ṭufla, بو bū > أمّ umm.
 Individual singular of collective plural and mass nouns: Similarly, collective plural and mass nouns form their feminine by the suffixation of a. For example, زيتون zītūn “olive” > زيتونة zītūna “an olive”, تمر tmar “dates” > تمرة tamra “a date”.
 Individual singular of verbal nouns: Generally, verbal nouns form their individual singulars by the suffixation of a. For example, بني bany > بنية banya, تفركيس tfarkīs > تفركيسة tfarkīsa.

The dual
Marking of the dual for nouns by adding -īn as a suffix to them is only used for quantity measures, for nouns having the CCVC form such as C is an ungeminated consonant and V is a short vowel and things often occurring in twos (e.g. eyes, hands, parents). In general, these nouns have broken plurals and not regular ones. Marking of the dual is also done by writing zūz before the regular or irregular plural noun. For example:
 صبع sbūɛ (finger) becomes صبعين sūbɛīn 
 ليل līl (night) becomes زوز ليالي zūz lyālī

The plural
The plural in Tunisian can be classified according to its structure. There are mainly two types of structure: suffixed structure and internal structure. However and as reported in many studies, the rate of broken plurals for Tunisian and by that the rate of the use of the Pluralization Internal Structure is more important than the one for Standard Arabic and several other Arabic dialects. This considerable use of the Internal Structure of Pluralization is considered by most of the linguists as an influence of the Berber substratum.

Using the Suffixed Structure, Singular nouns may form their plural by the suffixation of any of the following plural suffixes:

This kind of plural is considered as regular plurals. However, There is a suffixed structure which is considered as a broken plural which is the plural of name of the noun constituted of the name of a town or a group of people and the suffix ī. This structure is done to attribute the person to a group or a city and its plural is obtained by adding ā after the second letter of the root and adding a as a suffix in the end of the word.

Using the Internal Structure, the plural in Tunisian follows the following patterns such as C is an ungeminated consonant, V is a short vowel, C: is a geminated consonant:

 CaCC, CCaC and CāCiC could have multiple patterns as plural noun patterns. The criterion of the choice of the plural form for CaCC, CCaC and CāCiC is still not known.

Adjectives

Gender

Masculine
Uninflected adjectives are masculine singular. There are two main types of adjectives:
 Participial adjectives: Participles, whether real or historical, may function both as adjectives and nouns.
E.g. متغشّش mtġaššaš “angry”.
 Other adjectives: These include any non-participial adjectives.
E.g. طويل ṭwīl “tall”.

Feminine
Like participles and some nouns, adjectives form their feminine by the suffixation of a.
For example, جيعان jīɛān > جيعانة jīɛāna “hungry”, سخون sxūn > سخونة sxūna “hot”.

In some cases, when the adjective ends with an i vowel, the i becomes a y. E.g. باهي bāhi > باهية bāhya
Some uninflected adjectives are in the feminine. Their masculine counterparts are either suppletive or do not exist.

For example: حبلة ḥibla “pregnant”, عزوزة ɛzūza “old woman”.

The masculine counterpart of عزوزة ɛzūza is شايب šāyib, though, عزوز ɛzūz exists in some idiolects.

Some adjectives cannot be inflected either for gender or number. E.g. وردي wardi “pink”, حموم ḥmūm “disastreous”.

Number
Unlike nouns, adjectives are not inflected for dual. The plural is used instead.
Like nouns, there are two main types of structure: suffixed structure and internal structure.
 Suffixed Structure: There are two types of plural suffixes which can be suffixed to a singular adjective: –īn (when the adjective finishes with an i+Consonant) and –a (for all other situations excepting the ones having an internal form).
 Internal Structure: Generally, adjective's plural follows the following structures: CCāC (for CCīC, CCūC, CVCCūn and CVC: as singular patterns), CuCCā (for CCīC and CCiy as singular patterns), CCāCiC (for CVCâC, CVC:ūC, CCV:CV, CVCCV:C as singular patterns), CCuC (for CCīC, aCCā and aCCaC as singular patterns), CCaC (for CaCCī as a singular pattern), CCāCa (for CCīC and CVCCV as singular patterns and for adjectives finishing by an ān), CCī (for aCCaC and aCCā as singular patterns), CuCCān (for CuCāC as a singular pattern), CCaC:Ca (for CaCCūC as a singular pattern), CVC:āC (for CāCiC as a singular pattern), CūCa (for CīC as a singular pattern) and CCāCCa (for CVCCV:C as a singular pattern and for adjectives finishing by an ī).

Adjective forms

Comparative form
The comparative of superiority: The comparative form is the same whether the adjective is feminine or masculine.
 Adjectives composed of 3 consonants with a full vowel on the second The comparative form is formed by adding a before the adjective and by replacing the full vowel with a breve vowel, plus min after the adjective. E.g. كبير kbīr > أكبر من akbir min “bigger than”
 Adjectives ending with a vowel The comparative is formed by adding a as a prefix, and replacing the final vowel with ā. When the first syllable of the adjective has a long vowel, this vowel is removed. E.g. عالي ɛālī > أعلى aɛlā min “higher than”.

The comparative of inferiority: It's formed by the following structure: أقلّ aqall + noun + من min. For example, هي أقلّ طول من خوها hīya aqall ṭūl min xūha “she’s less tall than her brother”

The comparative of equality: It is formed by using the following structure: noun (subject) + فرد fard + (comparative) noun + personal pronoun + و w + noun (compared). For example, فاطمة فرد طول هي و خوها Fāṭma fard ṭūl hīya w xūha “Fatma is as tall as her brother”. This structure can be simplified as follows: noun + و w + noun + فرد fard + noun. For example, فاطمة و خوها فرد طول Fāṭma w xūha fard ṭūl “Fatma is as tall as her brother”

Superlative form
It is formed by adding واحد wāḥid (m.), واحدة waḥda (f.) or وحود wḥūd (pl.) after the comparative of superiority.

Proportion in Tunisian Arabic
In order to denote the proportion of the participants in the given action from a greater community, the adjectives and adverbs of proportion shown here are used.
 کل kull (adj.) “Every”
 جمیع or معا بعضنا jmīɛ (adj.) or mɛā bɛaḑnā (adv.) “Together”
 بعض or شويّة baɛḑ or šwayya (adj.) “Some” 
 فرد fard (adj.) “Same”
 وحد waḥd with possessive pronoun (adv.) “Alone”

Numerals

Cardinals 
 Cardinal numbers: The transcription of cardinal numbers is the same as in English and some other European languages. The number is read from left to right. This table provides several examples of names of cardinals in Tunisian Arabic and can give a better overview about this fact.

 Nouns following a cardinal number: 
 Number one is generally not used with the single object counted unless we want to emphasize that there is only a single thing. E.g. طاولة ṭāwla “a table”, طاولة واحدة ṭāwla waḥda “one table”.
 For the number two, we use the dual of the noun or we use  زوز zūz plus the plural of the noun.
 From 3 to 10, we use the number plus the plural of the noun. E.g. خمسة كتب xamsa ktub “five books”.
 From 11 to 19, we use the number to which we add the consonant n plus the noun in singular. E.g.  سبعطاش كتاب sbaɛţācn ktāb “17 books”.
 From 20 to 99, we use the number plus the singular. E.g. ثمانين دينار ŧmānīn dinār “80 Dinars”
 For numbers ending with a like مية mya, an –at is suffixed to it when used with a noun. E.g. مية دولار myāt dolār  “100 dollars”.
 For the other numbers, we use the number plus the singular. E.g. الف ميترو alf mītrū “1000 meters”.
 Number zero is generally expressed as حتّى ḥatta + noun. E.g. حتّى كرهبة ḥatta karhba “zero cars”.

Days of the week

Months of the year 

Note, that in this case, the modern months are a tunisification of the name of the months from French, inherited from the protectorate times.
The native names of the months were that of their original Latin names, following the berber calendar:

Ordinals 
The ordinals in Tunisian are from one to twelve only, in case of higher numbers, the cardinals are used.

Fractions 
There are special forms for fractions from two to ten only, elsewhere percentage is used. The Fractions can be used for various purposes like the expression of proportion and the expression of time... For example, the expression of 11:20 in Tunisian Arabic is il-ḥdāc w ŧluŧ and the expression of 11:40 in Tunisian Arabic is nuṣṣ il-nhār ġīr ŧluŧ. Similarly, midnight is nuṣṣ il-līl and noon is nuṣṣ il-nhār.

Time measurement during the day 

As said above, time measurement method and vocabulary below 1 hour is very peculiar in Tunisian and is not found in neither the other dialects of Maghrebi Arabic or standard Arabic. Indeed, Tunisian, uses fractions of 1 hour and a special unit of 5 minutes called دراج "drāj", to express time. Also, as in English as "it's 3 am/pm" or just "it's 3"  and contrary to other languages such as standard Arabic, Tunisian do not precise the word "sāɛa (hour)" when expressing the time of the day as the subject is considered implied. Below is the list of the vocabulary used for time indication:

Basic measures 
The Basic units for Tunisian Arabic are used in the same way as in English.

The measure units are accorded when in dual or in plural, for example:
 dqīqa becomes دقيقتين dqīqtīn (2 minutes) in dual
 sāɛa becomes سوايع swāyaɛ (hours) in plural

Prepositions 
There are two types of prepositions: single (commonly used) and compound prepositions (rarely used).

Single prepositions

Compound prepositions 
Compound prepositions are the prepositions that are obtained through the succession of two single prepositions. وسط Wusṭ, جيهة jīhit, شيرة šīrit and متاع mtāɛ can be used as second prepositions with any single preposition before it excepting وسط Wusṭ, جيهة jīhit, شيرة šīrit and متاع mtāɛ. The other prepositions are: من بين min bīn, من بعد min baɛd, من عند min ɛand, من تحت min taḥt, من قبل min qbal, من فوق min fūq, من ورا min wrā, كيف بعد kīf baɛd, كيف عند kīf ɛand, كيف تحت kīf taḥt, كيف قبل kīf qbal, كيف فوق kīf fūq, كيف ورا kīf wrā, كيف معا kīf mɛā, قبل فوق qbal fūq, على فوق ɛlā fūq, بتحت b- taḥt, في تحت fī taḥt, ببلاش b- blāš, من قدّام min quddām and حتّى قدّام ḥattā quddām.

Conjunctions

Coordinate conjunctions 
Coordinate conjunctions link verbs, adverbs, nouns, pronouns, clauses, phrases and sentences of the same structure.

Subordinate conjunctions 
Subordinate conjunctions introduce dependent clauses only. There two types of conjunctions: single and compound. The compound conjunctions mainly consist of prepositions that are compound with illī. The main Subordinate conjunctions for Tunisian are Waqt illī وقت اللي “When”, m- illī ماللي “Since”, qbal mā قبل ما “Before”, īđā إذا “If”, lūkān لوكان “If”, mā ما "what", bāš باش “In order to”, (ɛlā) xāṭir على) خاطر) “because”, (ɛlā) ḥasb mā على) حسب ما) “According to”.

Adverbs 
Adverbs can be subdivided into three subgroups: single, compound and interrogative.

Single adverbs 
 Adverbs of time:
 tawwa توة Now
 taww تو A moment ago 
 dīmā ديما Always
 bikrī بكري Early 
 fīsaɛ فيسع Fast, quickly
 māzāl مازال Still
 Adverbs of place:
 hnā هنا Here
 ġādī غادي There 
 Adverbs of manner:
 hakka هكة Like this
 hakkāka, hakkīka هكاكة، هكيكة Like that
 Adverbs of measure:
 barša برشة Much, very
 šwayya شوية Little 
 yāsir ياسر Very, much
 taqrīb تقريب About
 bark برك Only

Compound adverbs 
 Adverbs of time:
 taww taww تو تو Here and now / Immediately
 min baɛd من تو Afterwards 
 min bikrī من بكري A moment ago
 min tawwa من توة  From now on
 Adverbs of place:
 l- fūq لفوق On (Up)
 l- il-ūṭa لأوطى Bellow
 l- dāxil لداخل In
 l- barra لبرة Out
 l- quddām لقدام Upwards 
 l- tālī لتالي Backwards
 min hūnī من هوني From here
 min ġādī من غادي From there
 Adverbs of manner:
 b- il-sīf بالسيف Forcibly
 b- il-syāsa بالسياسة gently
 b- il-ɛānī بالعاني Purposely
 b- il-šwaya بالشوية Slowly
 b- il-zarba بالزربة Rapidly
 Adverbs of measure:
 ɛa- il-aqall عالاقل At least

Interrogative adverbs 
 Adverbs of the time:
 waqtāš وقتاش When
 nhārāš نهاراش Which day
 ɛāmāš عاماش Which year
 Adverbs of place:
 wīn, fīn وين، فين Where
 l- wīn لوين Where to
 min wīn, mnīn من وين، منين Where from
 Adverbs of manner:
 kīfāš كيفاش How
 Adverbs of measure:
 qaddāš قداش How much

Nouns derived from verbs
The nouns derived from verbs are the Active Participle, the Passive Participle and the Verbal Noun.

Participles
 Active Participle: The Active Participle is the noun used to call the person or the object who/that did the action. It can be used as a subject and an adjective.
 They are obtained for the simple verb having the root fɛal or faɛlil by adding ā between the first and the second letters of the root and changing the vowel between the last but one and the last letters of the root into i. For example, ɛāzif عازف is instrument player in Tunisian and is obtained from the verb ɛzaf عزف.
 They are obtained for the derived verbs by adding m as a prefix and changing the vowel between the last but one and the last letters of the root into i. For example, mšērik مشارك is a participant in Tunisian and is obtained from the verb šērik شارك.
 Passive Participle: The Passive Participle is the noun used to call the person or the object who/that received the action. It can be used as a subject and an adjective.
 They are obtained for the simple verb having the root fɛal or faɛlil by adding ma as a prefix and changing the vowel between the last but one and the last letters of the root into ū. For example, maɛzūfa معزوفة is a musical composition in Tunisian and is obtained from the verb ɛzaf عزف.
 They are obtained for the derived verbs by adding m as a prefix and changing the vowel between the last but one and the last letters of the root into a. For example, mhaddad مهدد is threatened person in Tunisian and is derived from the verb haddad هدد.

Verbal noun
The verbal noun is the noun that indicates the done action itself.
Its form is known through the pattern and root of the verb from which it is derived or rather the pattern of its singular imperative conjugation.
	Simple Verb:
 CiCC or Triconsonantal Verb: According to the root
 Regular: 	CiCC or CiCCa
 ʔ-C-C: 	māCCa
 C-C-ʔ: 	CCāya
 C-C-j: 	CiCy, CiCyān or CiCya
 C-w-C: 	CawCān
 C-C1-C1: 	CaC1C1ān
 CaCCiC or Quadriconsonantal Verb: CaCCCa
	Derived Verb: According to the pattern
 Regular: Verbal nouns for all regular derived verbs is obtained through the addition of ā between the last and the last but one letter of the root.
 Irregular: 
 Doubling the second letter of the root: taCCīC
 Adding t as a prefix and doubling the second letter of the root: tCaC1C1uC2
 Adding t as a prefix and ā between the first and the second letter of the root: tCāCuC
 Adding i as a prefix and t between the first and second letter of the root: iCtCāC

See also

Help: IPA for Tunisian Arabic

References

External links 

 Tunisian Arabic Arabizi Dictionary
 McNeil Tunisian Arabic Corpus
 Tunisian Arabic VICAV Dictionary
 Tunisian Arabic Swadesh list (from Wiktionary's Swadesh-list appendix)

Languages of Tunisia
Maghrebi Arabic
Arabic languages